Luke Farrell (born October 14, 1997) is an American football tight end for the Jacksonville Jaguars of the National Football League (NFL). He played college football at Ohio State.

Professional career
Farrell was drafted by the Jacksonville Jaguars in the fifth round, 145th overall, of the 2021 NFL Draft. He signed his four-year rookie contract with Jacksonville on May 20, 2021. Farrell played in all 17 games for the Jaguars during the 2021 season, catching his first pass during a Week 2 13–23 loss to the Denver Broncos. He finished the season with seven catches for a total of 56 yards and no touchdowns. His longest reception was 21 yards, during a Week 6 23–20 victory against the Miami Dolphins.

References

External links
 Ohio State Buckeyes bio

Living people
Jacksonville Jaguars players
American football tight ends
Ohio State Buckeyes football players
People from Perry, Ohio
Players of American football from Ohio
Sportspeople from Greater Cleveland
1997 births